Muertos de miedo ("Scared to Death") is a 1958 Mexican comedy film starring Kitty de Hoyos, Viruta and Capulina (Marco Antonio Campos and Gaspar Henaine), Carlos Agostí and José Jasso.

External links

Mexican comedy films
1950s Mexican films